= Albany Fire Department =

Albany Fire Department may refer to:

- Albany Fire Department (Georgia), fire department for the city of Albany in Georgia
- Albany Fire Department (New York), fire department for the city of Albany in New York
